Nivacortol (developmental code names WIN-27914 and NEBO-174; also known as nivazol and nivazole) is a synthetic glucocorticoid corticosteroid which was never marketed.

References

External links
 Nivazole - AdisInsight

Tertiary alcohols
Ethynyl compounds
Antiglucocorticoids
Corticosteroids
Fluoroarenes
Glucocorticoids
Phenyl compounds
Pregnanes
Pyrazoles